A swashbuckler is a  genre of European adventure literature that focuses on a heroic protagonist stock character who is skilled in swordsmanship, acrobatics, guile and possesses chivalrous ideals. A "swashbuckler" protagonist is heroic, daring, and idealistic: he rescues damsels in distress, protects the downtrodden, and uses duels to defend his honor or that of a lady or to avenge a comrade. 

Swashbucklers often engage in daring and romantic adventures with bravado or flamboyance. Swashbuckler heroes are gentleman adventurers who dress elegantly and flamboyantly in coats, waistcoats, tight breeches, large feathered hats, and high leather boots, and they are armed with the thin rapiers used by aristocrats. 

Swashbucklers are not unrepentant brigands or pirates, although some may rise from such disreputable stations and achieve redemption. His opponent is typically characterized as a dastardly villain. While the hero may face down a number of henchmen to the villain during a story, the climax is a dramatic one-on-one sword battle between the protagonist and the villain. There is a long list of swashbucklers who combine  courage, skill, resourcefulness, and a distinctive sense of honor and justice, as for example Cyrano de Bergerac, The Three Musketeers, The Scarlet Pimpernel, Robin Hood, and Zorro.

As a historical fiction genre, it is often set in the Renaissance or Cavalier era. The stock character also became common in the film genre, which extended the genre to the Golden Age of Piracy. As swashbuckler stories are often mixed with the romance genre, there  will often be a beautiful, aristocratic female love interest to whom the hero expresses a refined, courtly love. At the same time, since swashbuckler plots are often based on intrigues involving corrupt religious figures or scheming monarchs, the heroes may be tempted by alluring femme fatales or vampish courtesans.

Etymology
"Swashbuckler" is a compound of "swash" (archaic: to swagger with a drawn sword) and "buckler" (a small shield gripped in the fist) dating from the 16th century.

Historical background

While man-at-arms and sellswords of the era usually wore armor of necessity, their counterparts in later romantic literature and film (see below) often did not, and the term evolved to denote a daring, devil-may-care demeanor rather than brandishment of accoutrements of war. Swashbuckling adventures and romances are generally set in Europe from the late Renaissance up through the Age of Reason and the Napoleonic Wars, extending into the colonial era with pirate tales in the Caribbean.

Literature
Jeffrey Richards traces the swashbuckling novel to the rise of Romanticism, and an outgrowth of the historical novel, particularly those of Sir Walter Scott, "... medieval tales of chivalry, love and adventure rediscovered in the eighteenth century". This type of historical novel was further developed by Alexandre Dumas.

John Galsworthy said of Robert Louis Stevenson's 1888 swashbuckling romance, The Black Arrow, that it was "a livelier picture of medieval times than I remember elsewhere in fiction." Anthony Hope's 1894 The Prisoner of Zenda initiated an additional subset of the swashbuckling novel, the Ruritanian romance.

Theatre
The perceived significant and widespread role of swordsmanship in civilian society as well as warfare in the Renaissance and Enlightenment periods led to fencing being performed on theatre stages as part of plays. Soon actors were taught to fence in an entertaining, dramatic manner. Eventually fencing became an established part of a classical formation for actors.

Movie
Consequently, when movie theaters mushroomed, ambitious actors took the chance to present their accordant skills on the screen. Since silent movies were no proper medium for long dialogues, the classic stories about heroes who would defend their honour with sword in hand were simplified and sheer action would gain priority. This was the birth of a new kind of film hero: the swashbuckler. For Hollywood actors to depict these skilled sword fighters, they needed advanced sword training. Four of the most famous instructors for swashbuckling swordplay are William Hobbs, Anthony De Longis, Bob Anderson and Peter Diamond.

The larger-than-life heroics portrayed in some film franchise adventures (most notably the Indiana Jones movies) set in the modern era have been described as swashbuckling.

Film

The genre has, apart from swordplay, always been characterized by influences that can be traced back to the chivalry tales of Medieval Europe, such as the legends of Robin Hood and King Arthur. It soon created its own drafts based on classic examples like The Mark of Zorro (1920), The Three Musketeers (1921), Scaramouche (1923) and The Scarlet Pimpernel (1934). Some films did also use motifs of pirate stories. Often these films were adaptations of classic historic novels published by well-known authors such as Alexandre Dumas, Rafael Sabatini, Baroness Emma Orczy, Sir Walter Scott, Johnston McCulley, and Edmond Rostand.

Swashbucklers are one of the most flamboyant Hollywood film genres, unlike cinema verite or modern realistic filmmaking. The genre attracted large audiences who relished the blend of escapist adventure, historic romance, and daring stunts in cinemas before it became a fixture on TV screens. With the focus on action, adventure, and, to a lesser degree, romance, there is little concern for historical accuracy. Filmmakers may mix incidents and events from different historical eras.

As a first variation of the classic swashbuckler there have also been female swashbucklers. Maureen O'Hara in Against All Flags and Jean Peters in Anne of the Indies were very early action film heroines. Eventually the typical swashbuckler motifs were used up because they had so often been shown on TV screens. Later films such as The Princess Bride, the Pirates of the Caribbean series and The Mask of Zorro include modern takes on the swashbuckler archetype.

Television
Television followed the films, especially in the UK, with The Adventures of Robin Hood, Sword of Freedom, The Buccaneers, and Willam Tell between 1955 and 1960. US TV produced two series of Zorro in 1957 and 1990. Following the 1998 film The Mask of Zorro, a TV series about a female swashbuckler, the Queen of Swords, aired in 2000.

List of characters
Famous swashbuckler characters from literature and other media include the following:

 Doña María Teresa (Tessa) Alvarado/The Queen of Swords
 d'Artagnan Romances
 Don Diego de la Vega/the Zorro
 Robin Hood
 Peter Pan
 Captain Jack Sparrow
 Puss in Boots
 The Doctor
 Optimus Prime
 He-Man
 She-Ra 
 Luke Skywalker
 Athos, Porthos, and Aramis
 Captain Hector Barbossa
 Cyrano de Bergerac
 Sir Percy Blakeney/The Scarlet Pimpernel
 Peter Blood
 John Carter of Mars
 Edmond Dantès (The Count of Monte Cristo)
 Ivanhoe
 Indiana Jones
 Diego Alatriste
 Solomon Kane
 Khlit the Cossack
 Don Juan Tenorio
 Fandral
 Captain Harlock 
 Marco Del Monte
 Inigo Montoya
 Hiraga Saito
 Andre-Louis Moreau/Scaramouche
 Rudolf Rassendyll
 Dread Pirate Roberts
 Emilio Roccanera (The Black Corsair)
 Sandokan (The Tiger of Malaysia)
 Richard Sharpe
 Alan Breck Stuart
 Dan Tempest
 Guybrush Threepwood
 Will Turner
 Elizabeth Swann
 William Tell
 Lara Croft
 Zuko
 Samurai Jack
 Jamie McCrimmon
 Quentin Durward
 Geralt of Rivia
 Han Solo
 Nathan Drake (character)
 Conan the Barbarian
 Sokka
 April O'Neil
 Reepicheep
Buck
 Leonardo
 Taylor Earhardt
 Merrick Balinton
 Cameron Watanabe
 Tommy Oliver
 Anubis Doggie Cruger
 Casey Rhodes
 Sir Ivan of Zandar
 Yasmin Khan
 Amy Pond
 Rory Williams
 Wolverine
 Shang Chi
 Captain Kirk
 Chiro

Actors
Actors notable for their portrayals of swashbucklers include:

 Benoît-Constant Coquelin (1841–1909), was a French actor, and "one of the greatest theatrical figures of the age." He played "Cyrano de Bergerac" over 400 times and later toured North America in the role.
 In early 1883 James O'Neill (1847–1920) took over the lead role in "The Count of Monte Cristo" at Booth's Theater in New York. His interpretation of the part caused a sensation with the theater-going public and a company was immediately set up to take the play on tour. O'Neill bought the rights to the play. "Monte Cristo" remained a popular favorite and would continue to make its appearance on tour as regular as clockwork. O'Neill went on to play this role over 6,000 times.
 E. H. Sothern (1859–1933) was especially known for his heroic portrayal of Rudolph Rassendyl in the first stage adaptation of The Prisoner of Zenda, which he first played in 1895. The role made him a star.
Douglas Fairbanks (1883–1939) was a Hollywood movie star of the silent film era and was widely regarded as the predecessor to Errol Flynn.
Errol Flynn (1909–1959) was famously known for the action adventurer typified Hollywood's idea of the swashbuckler in films as Captain Blood (1935), The Adventures of Robin Hood (1938), and The Sea Hawk (1940).
Burt Lancaster (1913–1994) Although he was very much an all-round actor, successful in any kind of role, he starred in two swashbuckling films The Flame and the Arrow (1950) and The Crimson Pirate (1952), both produced through his own film production company Norma Productions. Lancaster also starred in and produced two swashbuckler-esque adventure films made in the same time-frame, Ten Tall Men (1951) and His Majesty O'Keefe (filmed in 1952 but released in 1954). Lancaster, a former circus acrobat, was noted for performing his own stunts.
 Mikhail Boyarsky (born 1949), who played d'Artagnan in d'Artagnan and Three Musketeers and its four sequels, as well as other swashbuckler characters in historical adventure movies like Gardes-Marines, Ahead!, Viva Gardes-Marines!, Don Cesar de Bazan, The Dog in the Manger, The Prisoner of Château d'If, Queen Margot, among others.

Sources for films 
Fiction writers whose novels and stories have been adapted for swashbuckler films include:

 Bernard Cornwell
 Alexandre Dumas, père
 Jeffery Farnol
 Paul Féval, père
 Théophile Gautier
 Anthony Hope
 Robert E. Howard
 Harold Lamb
 Johnston McCulley
 Baroness Orczy
 Arturo Pérez-Reverte
 Edmond Rostand
 Rafael Sabatini
 William Goldman 
 Emilio Salgari
 Sir Walter Scott
 Samuel Shellabarger
 Robert Louis Stevenson
 Michel Zevaco

See also 

 Adventure novel
 Cloak-and-dagger
 Historical fiction
 Historical fantasy
 Historical novel
 Ruritanian romance
 Sword-and-sandal
 Samurai cinema (literature)

References

External links 
 

Film genres
Lists of stock characters
Mercenaries
Military history of Europe
Stock characters
Adventure fiction
Heroic fantasy